Bad Luck Creek is a stream in Idaho County, Idaho, in the United States. It is located within the Selway-Bitterroot Wilderness.

See also
List of rivers of Idaho

References

Rivers of Idaho County, Idaho
Rivers of Idaho